The Bohemian Dancer is a 1926 German silent drama film directed by Frederic Zelnik and starring Lya Mara, Harry Liedtke, and William Dieterle. It premiered in Berlin on 5 March 1926. It is based on the operetta 1907 Die Försterchristl composed by Georg Jarno with a libretto by Bernhard Buchbinder. It was shot at the Staaken Studios in Berlin. The film's art direction was by Gustav A. Knauer and Andrej Andrejew who designed the sets. The film is set in Vienna and Hungary during the 18th century.

Cast

References

Bibliography

External links

1926 films
1920s historical drama films
German historical drama films
Films of the Weimar Republic
German silent feature films
Films directed by Frederic Zelnik
Films based on operettas
Films set in Hungary
Films set in Vienna
Films set in the 1760s
Films about royalty
German black-and-white films
1926 drama films
Silent drama films
1920s German films
Films shot at Staaken Studios
1920s German-language films